The OM603 engine was a straight-6 Diesel automobile engine from Mercedes-Benz used from 1984 through 1999. The 603 saw limited use in the W124, W126 and W140 model vehicles.

It is closely related to the 4 cylinder OM601 and the 5 cylinder OM602 engine families of the same era.

It produced 143 hp at 4600 rpm (euro market without catalytic converter produced 148hp) and 195 ft.lb at 2400 rpm with a compression ratio of 22.0:1. Versions 603.96x and  603.97x are turbocharged. Only turbocharged models of the 603 series were available to the U.S. market. The single camshaft and injection pump are driven by duplex chain from the crankshaft. A separate single row chain drives the oil pump. The camshaft operated the valves via hydraulic bucket tappets; valve clearance adjustment is automatic.

Fuel is injected into a pre-combustion chamber. A Bosch M in-line injection pump is used, with a mechanical governor and vacuum-operated stop control. The pump is lubricated by a connection to the engine oil circulation and the fuel lift pump is mounted on the side of the injection pump. Preheating is by glow plugs with automatic control of preheating time.

The 603 engine had a diesel particulate filter, or trap oxidizer, in the US market. As these were mounted at the cylinder head (modern traps are mounted further away), heat from these trap oxidizers caused failure of the aluminum cylinder heads on the first generation of 603-engined vehicles; debris from the traps could also damage the turbocharger. This first version was sold in the US from 1986 to 1987. Daimler-Benz removed these traps for free, and if the turbocharger had been determined to be damaged it was also replaced. Even without the heat from the trap oxidizers, the original #14 mold cylinder heads were weak and if overheated could crack. In general, the later model #17 or #22 mold cylinder heads are considered to be the definitive cure for cracked heads.

In 1990 the 350SD/SDL debuted, using a larger-displacement 3496cc OM603.97 engine that had more torque and a lower top RPM. The engine lived on in the W140 chassis after the W126 production ended, as the 300SD or S350, with a larger yet turbocharger and thus more power and torque. By the time of the 3.5L engine, the cylinder head issues of early 3.0L engine (US 1986-1987) had been corrected. However, in the 3.5L there exists a different situation that appeared on some engines; eventual head gasket erosion, and thus passage of oil into the #1 cylinder. As the 3.0L engine uses the same head oil passage design, yet does not appear to exhibit the problem - it might be that the larger bore in the 3.5 engine, the higher pressures, and resulting smaller head gasket surface area could conspire to cause a gasket erosion issue.

Versions of OM603 Mercedes 6-cylinder diesel engine

OM603
Diesel engines by model
Straight-six engines